Raymond Joseph Birmingham Jr. (born November 14, 1955) is an American former college baseball coach. He was a head baseball coach at the high school, junior college, and four-year college levels from 1981 to 1983 and 1988 to 2021, starting at Mayfield High School in Las Cruces, New Mexico from 1978 to 1983, then the College of the Southwest from 1988 to 1989, New Mexico Junior College from 1990 to 2007, and finally the New Mexico Lobos from 2008 to 2021.

Birmingham has over 1,200 cumulative career wins as a head coach. He was the 2005 NJCAA Coach of the Year and is a member of the NJCAA Baseball Coaches Hall of Fame. At the University of New Mexico, Birmingham was a three-time Mountain West Conference Coach of the Year and won four Mountain West championships.  Every program he coached was ranked in the top 25 teams in the country.

Coaching career

College of the Southwest
Birmingham's college baseball coaching career began in the late 1980s, when he was the head coach at NAIA school College of the Southwest and its new baseball program from 1988 to 1989. There, he had a 53–73 overall record. In 1989, the Mustangs reached No. 23 in the NAIA national rankings, won 33 games and advanced to the regional finals before losing to Dallas Baptist.

New Mexico JC

Birmingham first worked at New Mexico Junior College (NMJC) from 1983 to 1987 as assistant coach and public relations officer for the men's basketball team.

From 1990 to 2007, Birmingham was the first head baseball coach at NMJC. He had an overall record of 765–255–2. The program reached two NJCAA World Series during his tenure, winning a national championship in 2005 and finishing second in 2007. He won several Coach of the Year awards: NJCAA Division I in 2005, NJCAA Division I Region 5 in 2005 and 2007, and WJCAC in 1995, 1997, 1998, 2002, 2005, 2006, 2007.

Birmingham led NMJC to 17 straight winning seasons, and the Thunderbirds were a gaudy 378–88–2 (.805) from 2000–07. Under his leadership, NMJC had six players lead nationally in hitting and six teams that hit over .400, including the 2007 team that hit .416. The 2001 Thunderbirds hold the all-time NJCAA team batting avg. of .438.  The 2005 NMJC national championship team hit .411 during the regular season and .400 in postseason play. In 1998, NMJC led the country in home runs with 122. In 2008, NMJC named its baseball field after Birmingham.

Several of Birmingham's later played in Major League Baseball, including Brendan Donnelly, Armando Almanza, Jose Flores, Mike Vento, and David Carpenter.

In 2011, Birmingham was elected to the NJCAA Baseball Coaches Hall of Fame.

New Mexico
Ahead of the 2008 season, Birmingham got his first Division I job when he replaced Rich Alday at New Mexico. 

New Mexico had 30-win seasons in 2008 and 2009 and reached its first NCAA Tournament under Birmingham in 2010, when the team went 38–22 and finished second in the Mountain West. The Lobos defeated Stanford in the opening game of the Fullerton Regional, then lost consecutive games to Minnesota and Cal State Fullerton. New Mexico returned to the NCAA Tournament in 2011, 2012, 2013 and 2016, winning the MWC Tournament in 2011, 2012 and 2016. Birmingham’s Lobos won 7 different championships in 14 years at UNM.  
Birmingham was named the Mountain West Coach of the Year three times (2012, 2013, 2017). During the 2013 season Birmingham earned the 1,000th win of his career when the Lobos defeated the Air Force Falcons 19–5.

Known as one of the top hitting coaches in the nation, Birmingham has led the Lobos to seven top-10 national finishes in batting average in 10 seasons at UNM, including an NCAA-best .334 in 2013 and .363 in 2009. He also coached Justin Howard to an NCAA-leading .456 average in 2010 and D.J. Peterson to a .520 on-base percentage in 2012. In 2013 in addition to leading the nation in batting, UNM also ranked first in scoring (8.3 runs per game), on-base percentage (.422), hits (724), slugging (.504) and doubles per game (2.53). In 2016 the Lobos finished 12th in the nation in hitting (.316) and led the country in doubles (150) while also finishing in the top 10 in slugging (.492 – fifth) and on-base percentage (.410 – sixth).

In the summer of 2014, Birmingham served as hitting coach for USA Baseball's Collegiate National Team.

Between 2008 and 2017, New Mexico has had 32 MLB Draft selections, including future major leaguer Bobby LaFromboise in 2008 and MLB’s Silver Slugger award winning catcher Mitch Garver in 2013. The program's highest selection was D. J. Peterson, the 12th overall pick of the first round in 2013. In all, seven Lobos were chosen in the 2013 draft.

On April 18, 2021, Birmingham announced that he would retire after the season. He retired with a cumulative 432–341–8 record, the most wins in program history.

Head coaching record

Junior college
Below is a table of Birmingham's head coaching record at the junior college level.

College
Below is a table of Birmingham's head coaching record at the four-year college level.

References

External links
 June 2014 Interview at Youtube.com

Living people
1955 births
Hobbs High School alumni
New Mexico State University alumni
New Mexico Lobos baseball coaches
High school baseball coaches in the United States
NMJC Thunderbirds baseball coaches